Barnes v Addy (1874) LR 9 Ch App 244 was a decision of the Court of Appeal in Chancery. It established that, in English trusts law, third parties could be liable for a breach of trust in two circumstances, referred to as the two 'limbs' of Barnes v Addy: knowing receipt and knowing assistance.

Although the decision remains historically significant in common law countries, the House of Lords significantly revised the relevant equitable principles in cases such as Royal Brunei Airlines v Tan (1995) and Dubai Aluminium Co Ltd v Salaam (2002).

Statement of principle

In Royal Brunei Airlines v Tan, the House of Lords described this passage as the "much-quoted dictum" in Barnes v Addy:

This passage was adopted by the High Court of Australia as a statement of the 'rule in Barnes v Addy''' in Farah Constructions Pty Ltd v Say-Dee Pty Ltd (2007).

Facts

Henry Barnes appointed William Crush, John Lugar and John Addy to be testators and executors of his will. His money would be invested and then used as a £100 annuity for his widow, Ann, and his three daughters and son. John Addy, the sole remaining trustee, appointed another trustee, with an indemnity. Addy’s solicitors, including Mr William Duffield, had advised against appointing a sole trustee, but drew up the deeds of appointment and indemnity, introduced him to a stockbroker, and the broker transferred the trustee money. This trustee misapplied the trust property and became bankrupt. The children sued Addy and the solicitors.

At first instance, Wickens VC held the solicitors were not liable for the trustee's breach.

Judgment

Lord Selborne LC held that neither of the solicitors had any knowledge of or reason to suspect dishonesty in the transaction.

In any event, Barnes had not established a breach of trust by Addy:

Sir W M James LJ and Sir G Mellish LJ agreed.

Continuing significanceBarnes v Addy was the starting point for the academic debate as to the proper grounds of accessory liability and claims for knowing receipt of trust property. Lord Nicholls revised the test for assistance liability in Royal Brunei Airlines v Tan (1995), whereby it is no longer necessary for the trustee to have acted dishonestly and instead the key element is that the third party acted dishonestly. This change was deemed necessary on the facts of Royal Brunei as the defendant was a sole director of a company who had caused the dishonest misapplication of trust property, but it had been held that the director's mental state would not be imputed to the company which had held the proceeds under trust. Writing extra-judicially, Lord Nicholls has also argued that the receipt limb of liability for third parties is based on unjust enrichment, a proposition which was decisively rejected by the High Court of Australia in Farah Constructions Pty Ltd v Say-Dee Pty Ltd''.

See also

 Equity (law)
 Fiduciary

Notes

English trusts case law
1874 in British law
1874 in case law
Court of Chancery cases